Maciej Rogalski (born May 21, 1980 in Olsztyn) is a Polish football player currently playing for Mławianka Mława.

External links
 

1980 births
Living people
Polish footballers
Mławianka Mława players
Podbeskidzie Bielsko-Biała players
KSZO Ostrowiec Świętokrzyski players
Lechia Gdańsk players
Olimpia Grudziądz players
Chojniczanka Chojnice players
Ekstraklasa players
I liga players
Sportspeople from Olsztyn
Association football midfielders